Ejnar Jensen (17 February 1896 – 31 October 1973) was a Danish weightlifter. He competed in the men's heavyweight event at the 1920 Summer Olympics.

References

External links
 

1896 births
1973 deaths
Danish male weightlifters
Olympic weightlifters of Denmark
Weightlifters at the 1920 Summer Olympics
Sportspeople from Aarhus